The East Zenati languages (Blench, 2006) or Tunisian and Zuwara (Kossmann, 2013) are a group of the Zenati Berber dialects spoken in Tunisia and Libya.

Maarten Kossmann considers the easternmost varieties of Zenati dialects as transitional to Eastern Berber, but they are quite different from the neighboring Nafusi.

According to Kossmann, the dialect cluster of Tunisian Berber and Zuwara is consisting of the varieties spoken in mainland Tunisia (Sened (extinct), Matmata and Tataouine), Jerba and Zuwara, but not Nafusi which is considered a dialect of Eastern Berber.

Before Kossmann, Roger Blench (2006) considered East Zanati to be a dialect cluster consisting of Sened (extinct, including Tmagurt), Djerbi, Matmata (Tamezret, Zrawa & Taujjut), and Nafusi.

References

Berber languages
Zenati languages
East Zenati languages
Berbers in Libya
Berbers in Tunisia